Jobra High School is a high school in the Indian state of Odisha. The school was established in 1966 as a primary school; in 1979 it received high school status. Popularly known as Jobra Municipal High School is an Odia medium coeducational school. Students of Jobra and nearby locations, even from outside of Cuttack study there.

The school is run and approved by the Govt Of Odisha. It extends teaching facilities in humanities, social sciences, and physical sciences. The main objective of this institution is to disseminate knowledge to the students in different fields. Simultaneously, this institution also aims at the overall physical, mental and moral development of the students. Games and sports are also an integral part of this institution which inspires the students to be physically fit. There are also many societies and associations related to social service and cultural programmes, N.C.C. and scout. The syllabus of the school includes Odia, Hindi, English and Sanskrit in its language learning curriculum.

Smt. Gayatri Pattnaik is current Headmistress of the School.

References

High schools and secondary schools in Odisha
Cuttack district
1966 establishments in Orissa
Educational institutions established in 1966